Alpha Beam With Ernie is an edutainment video game released for the Atari 2600 by Atari, Inc. in 1983. It was developed in conjunction with the Children's Computer Workshop. The game was programmed by Michael Callahan and Preston Stuart.

Gameplay 

The object of Alpha Beam is to help Sesame Street'''s Ernie pilot a small shuttle, collect fuel tanks (marked by a letter of the alphabet), and return them to his space ship so that he can return to Earth.

The game was marketed as a family-friendly game that could teach children pre-reading skills such as identifying and matching letters. Alpha Beam'' was compatible with the Atari Kid's Controller, which was sold separately, although the regular keyboard controller is also compatible.

References 

1983 video games
Atari 2600 games
Atari 2600-only games
Children's educational video games
Sesame Street video games
Video games developed in the United States
Single-player video games